Azadegan may refer to:

 Azadegan League
 Azadegan, Chaharmahal and Bakhtiari
 Azadegan, Fars
 Azadegan, West Azerbaijan
 Azadegan 1, Kerman Province
 Azadegan Rural District (Kerman Province)
 Azadegan Rural District (Mazandaran Province)
 Azadegan Oil Field
 Rustai-ye Azadegan, Kerman Province
 Azadegan Industrial Works Complex, Isfahan Province

See also
Azadegan (disambiguation)
Dasht-e Azadegan (disambiguation)